Expo: Magic of the White City is a 2005 American direct-to-video historical documentary film directed and produced by Mark Bussler, and narrated by Gene Wilder. The documentary tells the story of Chicago's World's Columbian Exposition in 1893.

Synopsis
It begins by explaining Frederick Law Olmsted's planning of the fair and the architecture by Daniel Burnham.  It also details exhibits by many people, including George Westinghouse, Nikola Tesla and Thomas Edison.
In addition to detailing the fair itself, the documentary also describes the Midway Plaisance.  Features of the Midway included bellydancing, side-shows, saloons, and a large Ferris wheel.  Finally Expo: Magic of the White City discusses the aftermath of the fair and the legacy it left.

Cast
Gene Wilder as the Narrator

Release
It was released to DVD on September 13, 2005. Janson Media later acquired the copyright to the film in 2010.

DVD Special features
 Commentary tracks by Mark Bussler, Brian Connelly and David Cope (World's Fair Historian)
 Featurettes ("Making the Fair", "Art of the Fair", "Storyboards of the Fair", "Pictures of the Fair")
 Deleted scenes

External links
Official Page
Official Trailer

Synopsis, information and reviews on Rotten Tomatoes

2005 films
2005 documentary films
2005 independent films
American documentary films
Documentary films about architecture
Documentary films about technology
World's Columbian Exposition
Documentary films about United States history
Direct-to-video documentary films
Documentary films about Chicago
2000s English-language films
2000s American films